Bamayo (Bumayoh) is a Malayic Dayak language of Borneo.

Bamayo dialects form a chain that may be better considered three languages. Wurm and Hattori (1981) list these dialects as Delang (200,000 speakers), Kayung (100,000 speakers), Banana’ (100,000 speakers), Tapitn (300 speakers), Mentebah-Suruk (20,000 speakers), Semitau (10,000 speakers), and Suhaid (10,000 speakers), and additionally Arut (Sukarame), Lamandau (Landau Kantu), Sukamara (Kerta Mulya), Riam (Nibung Terjung), Belantikan (Sungkup), Tamuan, Tomun, Pangin, Sekakai, and Silat.

See also
List of Dayak groups of West Kalimantan

References

Ibanic languages
Languages of Indonesia